Dunsyre is a village in South Lanarkshire, Scotland. Dunsyre is associated with an ancient barony and parish church. The name of Dunsyre is of Celtic origin and is supposed to signify the "Hill of the Seer." It is located by the burn known as the South Medwin Water.

From 1867 until 1945 Dunsyre was served by a railway branch from Carstairs to Dolphinton, originally built by the Caledonian Railway, and the disused embankment of this runs along the south side of the village close to the church.

The surface is generally elevated, and rises further still into the surrounding hills. Dunsyre Hill overlooks the area from the north and Blackmount from the south. The small river of the South Medwin runs along the valley, eventually joining the river Clyde. The ornamental garden Little Sparta lies immediately to the west of the village.

References

External links
 "Dunsyre"- geo.ed.ac.uk
 Dunsyre.com and Dunsyre.net  Information about Dunsyre and local links.

Villages in South Lanarkshire